The NWA Pacific Northwest Junior Heavyweight Championship was the junior heavyweight championship of Elite Canadian Championship Wrestling, a member of the National Wrestling Alliance based in Vancouver, British Columbia. The championship was considered a secondary championship to the NWA Canadian Junior Heavyweight Championship, with both belts being defended in the promotion. The championship was established in 1998, with Tony Kozina as the first champion. The belt was deactivated in 2007.

Title history

See also
List of National Wrestling Alliance championships

References

Junior heavyweight wrestling championships
National Wrestling Alliance championships
Regional professional wrestling championships